Forbidden is a 1932 American pre-Code melodrama film directed by Frank Capra and starring Barbara Stanwyck, Adolphe Menjou, and Ralph Bellamy. An original story inspired by the 1931 novel Back Street by Fannie Hurst, with a screenplay by Jo Swerling, the film is about a young librarian who falls in love with a married man while on a sea cruise.

Plot
Librarian Lulu Smith shows up late to work for the first time in eight years—the victim of spring fever. Frustrated by her loneliness, she withdraws her life savings and buys a ticket for a two week romantic cruise to Havana— advertised as the "land of romance". On the ship, she meets Bob Grover, a lawyer with political ambitions, who mistook her room 66 for his room 99 after a few too many drinks. They have dinner together, and soon they develop a romantic attraction. In Havana, they spend their time together gambling, drinking, riding horses, and taking moonlit walks on the beach. When he asks why she came to Havana, she answers, "To meet you".

After they return, Lulu leaves her job in the Midwest, following Bob to the city. She takes a job as a clerical assistant for the Daily Record newspaper, where she is pursued by brash reporter Al Holland. A few months into their romance, Bob comes to Lulu's apartment for dinner, bringing two Halloween masks that they playfully wear. She is eager to reveal that she is pregnant with their child. Their merriment is interrupted by a phone call from Al, whose marriage proposal to Lulu prompts Bob to confess that he is married to an invalid wife whom he cannot abandon. He informs her that their relationship must end. Lulu begs him to continue their affair, but Bob refuses to let her waste her life on him. Furious, Lulu throws him out of her apartment without telling him that she is pregnant. A few months later, Lulu gives birth to a baby girl.

Two years later, Bob has become district attorney and Al is now city editor of the newspaper. Because Al's newspaper helped elect Bob, he feels that Bob now owes him a few favors. When Bob refuses to help him, Al vows to ruin him, and leaves. After Bob hires a detective to find Lulu, he comes to her apartment, where Lulu introduces him to his daughter Roberta. Soon after, while Lulu and Roberta are waiting to meet Bob, Al spots her and questions her about Roberta. When Bob arrives, Lulu tells Al that the baby is Bob's adopted daughter in order to protect Bob's reputation. She also tells Al that she is the baby's governess. Bob adopts Roberta, taking her home the next day to present to his wife, Helen, who has just returned from a health cure in Vienna. Helen is delighted with the child but questions Lulu's ability to care for the baby, believing her to be crazy or drunk. She tells Bob that she wishes to choose a different governess, and Bob tells her she can do as she wishes. Lulu runs out, and when Bob catches up with her, she ends their relationship for good. She leaves him and their child because she cannot bear living in his household— watching Helen be the mother to her daughter, and the wife to the man she loves.

Turning to Al for a job, Lulu becomes the "advice to the lovelorn" columnist for his newspaper. Al tries to get information from Lulu about Bob and Roberta in order to undermine Bob's political career, but she refuses to say anything. Years pass, and Lulu follows Bob's career as he becomes mayor, congressman, and eventually senator. She also follows her daughter becoming a beautiful debutante. Lulu is still working at the newspaper for Al, who has become managing editor. He continues to pursue her, but she remains in love with Bob.

On the night Bob is nominated for governor, he comes to Lulu's apartment, disheartened and ashamed of the hypocrisy of his secret life. He is finally ready to leave his wife and run away with Lulu. When he threatens to confess the truth to the public, Lulu talks him out of ruining his career and reputation. The next day, Lulu asks Al to marry her, knowing that Bob will not reveal the truth now that she is married.

On the night of Bob's election, Al reveals to Lulu that he knows all about her, Bob, and Roberta. He reads her a recent letter that he'd intercepted from Bob, who had written to Lulu of their relationship and their daughter. When she tries to retrieve it, Al hits her across the face, sending her sprawling across the room. Faced with the threat of Bob's destruction, Lulu shoots Al dead to prevent him from publishing the story. As she stands holding the gun, the radio announces Grover's victory as governor.

Under a year later, Lulu receives a pardon from Bob after serving a short jail term. She visits Bob who is on his deathbed, and he shows her his new will, which reveals everything about their relationship and leaves her half of his estate. After he dies, however, Lulu tears up the will and throws it away, in order to protect Bob's memory and their daughter Roberta, who is engaged to be married.

Cast

 Barbara Stanwyck as Lulu Smith
 Adolphe Menjou as Bob Grover
 Ralph Bellamy as Al Holland
 Dorothy Peterson as Helen
 Thomas Jefferson as Wilkinson
 Myrna Fresholt as Roberta (Baby)
 Charlotte Henry as Roberta (18)
 Oliver Eckhardt as Briggs

See also
 List of American films of 1932

References

External links
 
 
 
 

1932 films
American black-and-white films
Films directed by Frank Capra
1932 romantic drama films
American romantic drama films
Films with screenplays by Jo Swerling
Columbia Pictures films
Melodrama films
Films set in Havana
Films set on cruise ships
Films based on works by Fannie Hurst
1930s American films